File Under Miscellaneous is a 2010 Canadian short film, written, directed, edited, and composed by Jeff Barnaby. A dystopian science fiction film, it stars Glen Gould as a Mi'kmaq man who is tired of being victimized by anti-First Nations racism, and undergoes invasive surgery to become white.

The film premiered at the 2010 Toronto International Film Festival, and received a Genie Award nomination for Best Live Action Short Drama at the 31st Genie Awards.

References

External links
 

2010 short films
2010s science fiction films
Mi'kmaq-language films
Canadian science fiction short films
Films directed by Jeff Barnaby
2010s English-language films
2010s Canadian films